777 (seven hundred [and] seventy-seven) is the natural number following 776 and preceding 778. The number 777 is significant in numerous religious and political contexts.

In mathematics
777 is an odd, composite, palindromic repdigit. It is also a sphenic number, with 3, 7, and 37 as its prime factors. Its largest prime factor is a concatenation of its smaller two; the only other number below 1000 with this property is 138.

777 is also:
 An extravagant number, a lucky number, a polite number, and an amenable number.
 A deficient number, since the sum of its divisors is less than 2n.
 A congruent number, as it is possible to make a right triangle with a rational number of sides whose area is 777.
 An arithmetic number, since the average of its positive divisors is also an integer (152).
 A repdigit in senary.

Religious significance
According to the Bible, Lamech, the father of Noah lived for 777 years. Some of the known religious connections to 777 are noted in the sections below.

Judaism
The numbers 3 and 7 both are considered "perfect numbers" under Hebrew tradition.

Christianity
According to the American publication, the Orthodox Study Bible, 777 represents the threefold perfection of the Trinity.

Thelema
777 is also found in the title of the book 777 and Other Qabalistic Writings of Aleister Crowley pertaining to the law of thelema.

Political significance

Afrikaner Weerstandsbeweging
The Afrikaner Resistance Movement (Afrikaner Weerstandsbeweging, AWB), a Boer-nationalist, neo-Nazi, and white supremacist movement in South Africa, used the number 777 as part of their emblem.

The number refers to a triumph of "God's number" 7 over the Devil's number 666. On the AWB flag, the numbers are arranged in a triskelion shape, resembling the Nazi swastika.

Computing
In Unix's chmod, change-access-mode command, the octal value 777 grants all file-access permissions to all user types in a file.

Commercial

Aviation 

Boeing, the largest manufacturer of airliners in the United States, released the Boeing 777 (commonly nicknamed the Triple Seven) in June 1995. The family of 777s include the 777-200, 777-200ER, the 777-300, the 777-200LR Worldliner, the 777-300ER, and the 777 Freighter. The -100 wasn't continued in production due to loss of interest. In the 21st Century, Boeing has developed what will be in use for some different airlines, called the Boeing 777X. Projects have been delayed because of COVID-19, but will return to normal production.

777 Tower

777 Tower is an office building situated in the US and it was built in 1991.

Gambling and luck
777 is used on most slot machines in the United States to identify a jackpot. As it is considered a lucky number, banknotes with a serial number containing 777 tend to be valued by collectors and numismatists. The US Mint and the Bureau of Engraving and Printing sells uncirculated 777 $1 bills for this reason.

References

Integers
Numerology